Jiban Ghoshal alias Makhanlal (26 June 1912 — 1 September 1930) was an Indian independence activist and a member of the armed resistance movement led by Masterda Surya Sen, which carried out the Chittagong armoury raid in 1930.

Revolutionary activities
Ghoshal was born in a Brahmin family in Sadarghat, Chittagong, in British India. He was popularly known as Makhanlal. He joined in the freedom movement in student life. Ghoshal took active part in the police armoury raid at Chattagram. After the operation he fled from Chittagong towards Calcutta with another young revolutionary Ananda Gupta. Two senior member of the group, Ganesh Ghosh and Ananta Singh accompanied them in their journey. Police challenged the team in Feni railway station but finally Ghoshal and other succeed to escape after a short encounter. He took Shelter in Calcutta, Mirzapur street and Chandannagar, Hooghly district.

Death
Ghoshal remained underground after their escape. Police commissioner Charles Tegart attacked the hideout in Chandannagar, Hooghly on 1 September 1930, and Ghoshal was killed in the ensuing battle.

Popular culture 
The role of Jiban Ghoshal was portrayed by Smith Seth in popular Bollywood movie Khelein Hum Jee Jaan Sey in 2010.

References

1912 births
1930 deaths
People shot dead by law enforcement officers in India
Revolutionary movement for Indian independence
Indian revolutionaries
Indian independence activists from Bengal
People from Chittagong